Frida's Songs (Swedish: Fridas visor) is a 1930 Swedish comedy film directed by Gustaf Molander and starring Elisabeth Frisk, Bengt Djurberg and Tore Svennberg. It was shot at the Råsunda Studios in Stockholm. The film's sets were designed by the art director Vilhelm Bryde.

Cast
 Elisabeth Frisk as 	Frida Blomgren
 Bengt Djurberg as 	Åke Brunander
 Tore Svennberg as 	Brickman
 Sigurd Wallén as Gyllberg
 Håkan Westergren as 	Hasse Brickman
 Lili Lani as 	Miss Daisy
 Albert Paulig as 	Kaufmann
 Harry Ahlin as 	Clown 
 Charlie Almlöf as 	Visitor at the circus 
 Helge Andersson as 	Worker at the circus 
 Ossian Brofeldt as Visitor at the circus 
 Ernst Brunman as 	Singer 
 Thor Christiernsson as 	Older man 
 Annalisa Ericson as 	Dancer 
 Harry Essing as Lauging visitor at the circus 
 Hartwig Fock as 	Father with twins 
 Hilding Gavle as 	Visitor at the circus 
 Mona Geijer-Falkner as Waitress 
 Disa Gillis as 	Lilla Grisen 
 Thure Holm as 	Older man 
 Sune Holmqvist as 	Boy 
 Jullan Jonsson as 	The fireman's mother 
 Helge Kihlberg as 	Police lieutenant 
 Dagny Lind as 	One of Hasse's girlfriends 
 Hugo Lundström as 	Visitor at the circus 
 Sven Magnusson as Young guest at the restaurant 
 John Melin as 	Fireman 
 Gull Natorp as 	Post clerk 
 Rutger Nygren as 	Fireman
 Gustaf Salzenstein as 	Visitor at the circus 
 Åke Uppström as 	Lauging visitor at the circus 
 Tom Walter as Visitor at the circus

References

Bibliography 
 Wallengren, Ann-Kristin.  Welcome Home Mr Swanson: Swedish Emigrants and Swedishness on Film. Nordic Academic Press, 2014.

External links 
 

1930 films
Swedish comedy films
1930 comedy films
1930s Swedish-language films
Films directed by Gustaf Molander
Swedish black-and-white films
1930s Swedish films